Vewrdini may refer to:

 Denis Verdini (born 1951), Italian politician and banker
 Luca Verdini (born 1985), Italian motorcycle racer

See also 
 Verdin (disambiguation)